Lebanon is a historic railway station located in Lebanon, Lebanon County, Pennsylvania.  It was designed by George Watson Hewitt and built in 1885, by the Cornwall & Lebanon Railroad. The building was expanded in 1912. It is a two-story, brick, brownstone, and terra cotta building in an eclectic Victorian style reflecting 17th-century Flemish, Romanesque, and Chateauesque influences.  It features a broad porch roof with ornamental iron brackets. The Cornwall & Lebanon Railroad opened in 1883, and was acquired by the Pennsylvania Railroad in 1918.

It was added to the National Register of Historic Places in 1974 as the Cornwall & Lebanon Railroad Station. It is located one block south of the Reading Railroad's Lebanon station.

Presently, the Lebanon railway station is being used by Strickler Insurance Agency. The building can be viewed during regular office hours.

References

Former Pennsylvania Railroad stations
Railway stations on the National Register of Historic Places in Pennsylvania
Railway stations in the United States opened in 1885
Transportation buildings and structures in Lebanon County, Pennsylvania
National Register of Historic Places in Lebanon County, Pennsylvania
Former railway stations in Pennsylvania